The Sommêtres (1,079 m) are a chain of rocks overlooking the Doubs, north of Le Noirmont in the canton of Canton of Jura.

The Sommêtres are a popular climbing area.

References

External links
Sommêtres on Hikr

Mountains of the Jura
Mountains of the canton of Jura
Mountains of Switzerland
One-thousanders of Switzerland